The 2006–07 Southern Hemisphere tropical cyclone season comprises three different basins. Their respective seasons are:

2006-07 South-West Indian Ocean cyclone season west of 90°E,
2006-07 Australian region cyclone season between 90°E and 160°E, and
2006-07 South Pacific cyclone season east of 160°E.